Melaleuca incana, commonly known as grey honey-myrtle, is a plant in the myrtle family, Myrtaceae and is endemic to the south-west of Western Australia and is naturalised in the south of Victoria in Australia. It is commonly grown as a garden plant and produces large numbers of white or creamy yellow flowers, sometimes highly scented, in spring.

Description 
The leaves and young branches are covered with fine, soft hairs giving the foliage a grey appearance.

The flowers are arranged in spikes, usually on the ends of branches which continue to grow after flowering. The stamens are arranged in five bundles around the flower, each bundle containing between 3 and 11 stamens.

Taxonomy and naming
This species was first formally described in 1819 by Robert Brown in Edward's Botanical Register. Edwards called the plant "Grizzly Melaleuca" and noted that the plant was ...first observed by Mr. Brown, in King George the Third's Sound, on the south-west coast of New Holland. ... We were favoured with the specimen, for the drawing, by Lady Aylesford ... We are indebted to Mr. Brown for the specific characters, and all we know concerning the plant. The specific epithet (incana) is from the Latin incanus meaning "quite grey", "in reference to the colour of the leaves".

In 1992, Bryan Alwyn Barlow described two subspecies and the names are accepted by Plants of the World Online:
 M. incana subsp. incana occurs on the south-west coast of Western Australia between Albany and Jurien Bay and inland as far as the Dryandra woodland and is naturalised in parts of Victoria.
 M. incana subsp. tenella occurs on the south coast of Western Australia between Albany and Esperance.

Distribution and habitat
This melaleuca occurs in the south-west of Western Australia and on the south coast as far east as Esperance in the Jarrah Forest, Swan Coastal Plain and Warren biogeographic regions. It grows on swamp edges, in low woodland and heath in peaty soil and sand.

Conservation status
Melaleuca incana is listed as "not threatened" by the Government of Western Australia Department of Parks and Wildlife.

Use in horticulture
This species, especially the nominate subspecies incana is widely cultivated. It is a hardy plant, fast growing, tolerating a range of soils and conditions after initial establishment and is frost hardy. It is widely available in commercial nurseries and tolerates pruning to form a hedge. It is susceptible to scale insect attack.

References

incana
Myrtales of Australia
Rosids of Western Australia
Plants described in 1819
Endemic flora of Western Australia